Hori Naohiro may refer to:

Hori Naohiro (Muramatsu) (1861–1919), daimyō of Muromatsu Domain
Hori Naohiro (Suzaka) (1719-1777), daimyō of Suzaka Domain

See also
Hori clan